Ronald "Ron" Emerson Crawford (December 6, 1939 - December 20, 2015) was an American water polo player who competed in the 1959 Pan American Games, the 1960 Summer Olympics, in the 1964 Summer Olympics, and in the 1968 Summer Olympics.

Career 
Crawford was a member of the American water polo team which took the gold medal in the 1959 Pan American games.

Crawford was a member of the American water polo team which finished seventh in the 1960 tournament. He played six matches and scored five goals.

Four years later, he was eliminated in the first round with the American team in the 1964 Olympic tournament. He played three matches and scored four goals.

At the 1968 Olympic water polo tournament, he finished fifth with the American team. He played all eight matches but did not score a goal.

In 1966, he became a water polo coach at Beverly Hills High School, where he continued to coach until at least the early 1990s.

In 1977, Ronald Crawford was inducted into the USA Water Polo Hall of Fame. In 1983 he became the first American water polo player to be inducted into the international water polo Hall of Fame.

Death and legacy 
Ronald Crawford was a Manhattan Beach resident of 53 years, died peacefully on December 20, 2015 surrounded by his family.

References

External links
 
 Water Polo Legends pictures and information
 Water Polo Legends short bio
 Water Polo Legends 1960 US Olympic Team Photo
 Water Polo Legends 1964 US Olympic Team Photo
 Water Polo Legends 1968 US Olympic Team Photo
 

1939 births
2015 deaths
American male water polo players
Olympic water polo players of the United States
Water polo players at the 1960 Summer Olympics
Water polo players at the 1964 Summer Olympics
Water polo players at the 1968 Summer Olympics
American water polo coaches